A. I. M. Mostofa Reza Nur is a former Lieutenant General of the Bangladesh Army and former Principal Staff Officer, head of the Armed Forces Division.

Career
Nur was commission in the Bangladesh Army on 11 January 1975.

From 2004 to 2006, he served as the Principal Staff Officer, head of the Armed Forces Division. 6 April 2006 he was appointed the Ambassador of Bangladesh to Kuwait. He served as the ambassador till 3 June 2008.

Nur is a member of Baridhara DOHS Parishad. He participated in the Prime Bank Cup Golf Tournament in 2015 and won the hole-in-one competition.

References

Living people
Bangladesh Army generals
Year of birth missing (living people)
Principal Staff Officers (Bangladesh)
Ambassadors of Bangladesh to Kuwait